The Chattanooga Lookouts are a Minor League Baseball team of the Southern League and the Double-A affiliate of the Cincinnati Reds. They are located in Chattanooga, Tennessee, and are named for nearby Lookout Mountain. The team plays its home games at AT&T Field which opened in 2000 and seats 6,340 fans. They previously played at Engel Stadium from 1930 through 1999, with a one-year break in Montgomery, Alabama's Cramton Bowl in 1943.

History

In 1906, Oliver Burnside "O.B." Andrews, owner of the Andrews Paper Box Company, took ownership of a franchise in the South Atlantic League relocating the Single-A team to Chattanooga. The team adopted the name Lookouts in 1909 after a fan contest.  The following year Andrews purchased the Double A Southern Association franchise from Little Rock and relocated them to Chattanooga. The team began playing on Andrews Field in the 1100 block of East 3rd Street, which would remain the site of their home stadium for close to a hundred years.

Joe Engel bought the Chattanooga Lookouts in 1926 and opened Engel Stadium in 1930 on the site of Andrews Field. The first game in the new stadium was played April 15, 1930 with the Lookouts beating the Atlanta Crackers 6-5 in front of approx. 16,000 fans.

In 1931, the New York Yankees played an exhibition game against the Lookouts. During the game, a 17-year-old girl named Jackie Mitchell pitched for the Lookouts and struck out Major League greats Lou Gehrig and Babe Ruth. Many reports of this story include a footnote claiming that a few days after the game, baseball commissioner Kenesaw Mountain Landis voided Mitchell's contract, claiming that baseball was "too strenuous" for women. This has been rebutted here, and directly contradicts a profile of Mitchell published a few months later. MLB didn't introduce a ban on contracts for female players until June 21, 1952 (which was repealed in 1992).

After winning the 1932 Southern Association pennant, the Lookouts won the Dixie Series, a postseason interleague championship between the champions of the Southern Association and the Texas League, defeating the Beaumont Exporters, 4–1, in the best-of-seven series.

During owner Joe Engel's tenure, the Lookouts won four championships – three with the Southern Association and a fourth with the South Atlantic League. Engel led a charge to own the Lookouts privately, with the help of several hundred fans as shareholders from 1938 to 1942. In 1939, as a privately owned franchise under coach Kiki Cuyler, the Lookouts claimed a championship. (The original Montgomery Rebels team had folded due to World War II in 1943 and would return to Montgomery in 1946 in the now-defunct Southeastern League.) The Lookouts managed to move back to Chattanooga in December of that year after Engel organized a letter-writing campaign aimed at Clark Griffith, the owner of the Senators at the time.

The team, which plays in the Southern League, has been the Double-A affiliate of a major league ballclub since 1932. From 1988 through 2008, the Lookouts were the Double-A affiliate of the Cincinnati Reds. For the 2009 through 2014 seasons, the Los Angeles Dodgers served as the parent club.  In affiliating with the Twins in 2015, the Lookouts rekindled a relationship with the franchise that, as the 1901–1960 edition of the Washington Senators, spent the longest period as its parent team.

It was announced on September 25, 2018, that the Lookouts would resume their affiliation with the Reds.

In conjunction with Major League Baseball's restructuring of Minor League Baseball in 2021, the Lookouts were organized into the Double-A South in which they continued as an affiliate of the Reds. In 2022, the Double-A South became known as the Southern League, the name historically used by the regional circuit prior to the 2021 reorganization.

Television and radio
All Chattanooga Lookouts games are televised on MiLB.TV. Since 2016, all games are broadcast on 96.1 The Legend. Larry Ward is the lead broadcaster. Lookouts games were broadcast on WDOD (1310 AM) until the 2011 season. From 2011 to 2015, games were broadcast on WALV-FM (105.1 FM, "ESPN Chattanooga").  Currently, all Lookouts games are broadcast on WLND 98.1 The Lake starting with the 2019 season.

Roster

Retired numbers
26 – Dernell Stenson, OF, 2003

References

External links

 Chattanooga Lookouts official site

Southern League (1964–present) teams
Baseball teams established in 1885
Professional baseball teams in Tennessee
Sports in Chattanooga, Tennessee
Los Angeles Dodgers minor league affiliates
Cincinnati Reds minor league affiliates
Cleveland Guardians minor league affiliates
Oakland Athletics minor league affiliates
Philadelphia Phillies minor league affiliates
Seattle Mariners minor league affiliates
Washington Senators minor league affiliates
Minnesota Twins minor league affiliates
Southern League (1885–1899) teams
1885 establishments in Tennessee
South Atlantic League (1904–1963) teams
Southern Association teams
Double-A South teams